Jessie Lee may refer to:

 Jessie Lee Elementary School
 Jessie Lee Hester, American football wide receiver
 Bonnie Lee aka Jessie Lee Frealls (1931–2006), American blues singer

Fictional characters
 Jessie Lee, fictional character from the move Posse (1993 film)
 Jessie Lee, fictional character from the movie Gang of Roses
 "Jessie Lee", a song from the album Cucamonga (album)

See also 
 Jessica Lee (disambiguation)
 Jesse Lee (disambiguation)
 Jess Lee (disambiguation)
 Jessie Li (born 1992), Chinese actress